LDODK (Leer Door Oefening De Korfbalsport) is a Dutch korfball club located in Gorredijk, Netherlands. The club is a fusion between club from the towns of Gorredijk and Ter Wispel. club is The team plays in green shirts and black shorts / skirts.

History

Since the promotion to the Korfbal League after the 2011/2012 season LDODK has been represented in the top division for 4 season now.

Current squad
Squad for the 2015-16 season - Updated: 1 April 2016

Women
 1  Marjon Visser
 2  Diana van der Vorst
 4  Myrthe Heres
 5  Berber Buis
 6  Hilde de Boer
 8  Femke Faber
 9  Betty Jansma
 10  Daniëlle Hulst
 22  Marit Minkes

Men
 11  Erwin Zwart
 13  Jenmar de Graaf
 14  Martijn Zwart
 15  Andre Zwart
 16  Markus de Boer
 17  Collin van der Molen
 18  Henk Bijker
 19  Jurjen Bosma
 20  Menno Russchen

References

External links
 LDODK Official website

Korfball teams in the Netherlands